Latala may refer to:
Latala is a village in Dehaj District, Kerman Province, Iran. 
Latala (Ludhiana West) is a village located in Ludhiana district, Punjab.